A came is a divider bar used in glass panes.

Came may also refer to:
 Came, Pyrénées-Atlantiques, a commune in France
 Çamë, or Cham, an Albanian subgroup
 Came (surname)

See also 
 Kame (disambiguation)
 Caim (disambiguation)
 Winterborne Came, Dorset, England